The 2015–16 Boston College Eagles men's ice hockey team represents Boston College in the 2015–16 NCAA Division I men's ice hockey season. The team is coached by Jerry York, '67, his twenty-second season behind the bench at Boston College. The Eagles play their home games at Kelley Rink on the campus of Boston College, competing in Hockey East.

The Eagles competed in two tournaments during the 2015–16 season, the first of which took place during the holiday break, the traditional tournament portion of the college hockey season. The 15th Annual Florida College Hockey Classic, played on December 28 and 29 at Germain Arena in Estero, Florida showcased the Eagles playing Ohio State in the first round, as well as Providence versus host Cornell. The Eagles fell to the Friars of Providence 2–1 in the consolation round, having lost to eventual Harkness Cup winner Ohio State 3–2 in the first round. Boston College previously played in and won the Florida College Hockey Classic in 2004. On February 1 and 8, the Eagles played in the 64th Annual Beanpot Tournament at the TD Garden in Boston, Massachusetts, defeating Harvard 3–2 in the first round and winning the title by defeating Boston University 1–0 in overtime of the championship. They reclaimed the Beanpot trophy after missing the championship match in 2015, having previously won five titles in a row from 2010 to 2014.

The Eagles finished the season 28–8–5, and 15–2–5 in conference play, capturing a share of the Hockey East regular season title, splitting the title with Providence. They advanced to the semifinals of the Hockey East tournament, but lost to Beanpot rival Northeastern, who would eventually win the Hockey East championship for the first time since 1988. They Eagles fared well in the NCAA Tournament as well, where they would win the Northeast Regional, played at the DCU Center in Worcester. After dispatching Harvard in the first round and closely defeating Minnesota-Duluth in the regional final, the Eagles earned a ticket to the program's 25th Frozen Four in Tampa, Florida (an NCAA record for most appearances). There, however, they fell to Quinnipiac 2–3, who advanced to play in the national title game. There, the Bobcats fell to champions North Dakota, 5–1.

Previous season recap

The Eagles entered the 2015–16 season following a First round loss to Denver in the NCAA tournament, and a quarterfinals loss to Vermont in the Hockey East Tournament. The Eagles did capture one trophy during the 2014–15 season, winning the Ledyard Bank Classic with a 3–2 victory over Dartmouth, and finished with a strong 21–14–3 record and 12–7–3 in conference play. They failed to defend their Beanpot title for the first time in six seasons, but picked up the consolation win with a 3–2 victory over Harvard. Noah Hanifin led the way for the Eagles as a freshman, earning All-Second Team honors in Hockey East, while fellow freshman Alex Tuch, who was the team's leading point-scorer, earned a spot on the All-Rookie team.

Offseason

Seven Senior Eagles graduated in May: Assistant Captain Michael Sit – F, Assistant Captain Quinn Smith – F, Destry Straight – F, Cam Spiro – F. Danny Linell – F, Brian Billett – G, and Brad Barone – G.

Junior defenseman Mike Matheson decided to forgo his senior year of eligibility to enter the NHL, signing with his drafted team, the Florida Panthers.

Senior defensemen Teddy Doherty was named Captain, with Juniors Steven Santini, Chris Calnan, and Ian McCoshen named Assistant Captains for the 2015–16 season.

On June 26, freshman defenseman Noah Hanifin was drafted 5th overall by the Carolina Hurricanes in the 2015 NHL Entry Draft. He signed an entry-level contract with the Hurricanes on July 11, forgoing the rest of his NCAA eligibility.

On September 22, graduated forward Quinn Smith signed with the Idaho Steelheads of the ECHL.

Also in the offseason, graduated forward Destry Straight signed with the Rapid City Rush and graduated goalie Brad Barone with the Elmira Jackals, both of the ECHL.

Recruiting
Boston College added nine freshmen for the 2015–16 season: six forwards, two defensemen, and a goalie.
 Chris Birdsall, G – A well touted goalie with good size and skill, Birdsall will back up Thatcher Demko with the departures of Brad Barone and Brian Billett due to graduation. Birdsall last played for the Youngstown Phantoms of the USHL, netting a 2.46 GAA and .914 save percentage, both top-5 league marks. Birdsall is described as a hard working and athletic goalie.
 Jeremy Bracco, F – Bracco finished on a record note with the US-NTDP last season, setting the team's record for both assists in a season (64) and career (122). He also finished third on the team's career point scoring list with 168, third only to Phil Kessel (180) and Patrick Kane (172). While playing for the United States at the 2015 U18 World Juniors, Bracco assisted on fellow recruit Colin White's overtime winning goal in the championship match, winning gold over Finland. Bracco is described as having superb passing and skating skills, as well as elite vision. Jeremy was drafted 61st overall by the Toronto Maple Leafs in the 2015 Draft.
 Chris Brown, F – Younger brother of former Eagle Patrick Brown, son of former Eagle Doug Brown and nephew of Associate Head Coach Greg Brown, Chris joins the Eagles having most recently played with the Tri-City Storm of the USHL. He is characterized as a passionate, hard-working, two-way forward and was drafted 151st Overall by the Buffalo Sabres in the 2014 Draft.
 Josh Couturier, D – A local out of Newburyport, MA, Josh is one of two defenseman recruited for the Eagles this season. Couturier last played with the Boston Junior Bruins in the USPHL. A large 6’ 2” body, Couturier adds size, solid defense and a strong shot to the Eagle's D-core.
 Joey Dudek, F – Most recently having played with the Chicago Steel of the United States Hockey League, Dudek, who played alongside fellow recruit Chris Shero at Kimball Union Academy, is described as a creative, crafty goal scorer. He was drafted 152nd Overall by the New Jersey Devils in the 2014 Draft. His father is Joe Dudek, who is famous in NCAA football for breaking Walter Payton’s record for career touchdowns in 1985.
 Casey Fitzgerald, D – Younger brother of junior Eagle forward Ryan Fitzgerald, Casey joins the Eagles as the other defenseman recruit for the season. Having last played on the US National Development Team, he is described as having great vision and elite hockey-IQ. His and Ryan’s father Tom, is currently the assistant General manager of the Pittsburgh Penguins.
 Chris Shero, F – Played for the South Shore Kings of the USHL in 2014–15, and played in previous years with fellow recruit Joey Dudek at Kimball Union Academy. Shero is tenacious player with high intelligence and character. Chris’ father Ray is an NHL executive, currently serving as the general manager of the New Jersey Devils and former GM of the Pittsburgh Penguins.
 Colin White, F – White arrives at Boston College an American hero after scoring the overtime-winning goal over Finland at the 2015 U18 World Juniors, skating alongside fellow recruit Jeremy Bracco for the United States. Colin previously skated for the US National Development Team alongside fellow recruit Casey Fitzgerald. White, an assistant captain for numerous national teams he played for (U17/U18), is a natural leader and detail oriented. He was drafted 21st overall by the Ottawa Senators in the 2015 Draft and is a local native from Hanover, MA.
 Miles Wood, F – Wood rejoins fellow Eagles Thatcher Demko, Alex Tuch, Ian McCoshen, and Noah Hanifin after skating for the United States national junior team at the 2015 World Juniors. Miles, drafted 100th overall by the New Jersey Devils in the 2013 Draft, is described as a physical, gritty power-forward. His father Randy was a college hockey player for Yale and his older brother Tyler currently plays for Brown.
 Both White and Bracco won goal medals playing for the United States at the 2014 U-17 World championships and the 2015 U18 World Juniors.

Midseason Additions
In addition to the nine players recruited at the start of the season, the Eagles added two early enrollees to the program who accelerated their arrival to the school. Defenseman Michael Kim and goalie Ian Milosz both played for the Boston Junior Bruins of the USPHL before arriving at Boston College for the second semester. Kim first dressed on December 29, 2015, and Milosz started in his first appearance on January 8, 2016, both games being against Providence College.

Charlie Van Kula was also added as an additional backup goaltender; he had been a team manager for the previous two seasons and had played at St. Joseph's Prep before attending Boston College.

2015–2016 roster

Departures from 2014–2015 team
Brad Barone – G – Graduation – Signed with the Elmira Jackals of the ECHL.
Brian Billet – G – Graduation
Noah Hanifin – D – Signed with the Carolina Hurricanes, forgoing rest of NCAA career.
Danny Linell – F – Graduation
Mike Matheson – D – Signed with the Florida Panthers, forgoing senior season.
Michael Sit – F – Graduation
Quinn Smith – F – Graduation – Signed with the Idaho Steelheads of the ECHL.
Cam Spiro – F – Graduation – Signed with the Gladsaxe Bears in the Danish Hockey League.
Destry Straight – F – Graduation – Signed with the Rapid City Rush of the ECHL.

2015–16 Eagles

As of January 9, 2016.

Coaching staff

Standings

Schedule

Regular season 

|-
!colspan=12 style=""| Exhibition

|-
!colspan=12 style=""| Regular season

|-
!colspan=12 style=""| Hockey East Tournament

|-
!colspan=12 style=""| NCAA Tournament

On September 21, BC was ranked first in the Hockey East pre-season coaches poll, with 7 first place votes.
On September 28, BC was ranked first in the NCAA pre-season USCHO poll, with 19 first place votes. They were also ranked first in the USA Today preseason poll, which was released on October 5.
On October 28, it was announced that freshman Jeremy Bracco decided to leave the program after playing five games, joining the Kitchener Rangers of the OHL.
With the win over New Hampshire on November 21, the Eagles tied the record for best start to a season for the program under Jerry York, going 10-1-0, matching the feat first accomplished in the 2012-13 season. With the win over Connecticut on November 24, the Eagles surpassed that record with an 11–1–0 start, the best season start under York, and third best in program history.
On December 7, Colin White and Casey Fitzgerald were named to the preliminary roster for the US National Junior team which competed at the 2016 World Juniors in Helsinki, Finland. Notable omissions from the roster were Alex Tuch, who was a member of the 2015 team, and Jeremy Bracco. Casey Fitzgerald was also cut from the final roster, leaving White the only representative from Boston College.
On December 29, with White playing in the World Juniors and Wood serving a one-game suspension as a result of a game misconduct received on December 28, BC added early enrollee Michael Kim to the roster to fill the gap on the defensive line.
On January 8, with both Demko and Birdsall recovering from injuries, the Eagles added a second early enrollee to the squad, goalie Ian Milosz, who started in his first career game.
On January 22, Jerry York earned his 1,000th career win as a head coach with an 8–0 victory over UMass.
On January 29, goalie Thatcher Demko earned his eighth shutout of the season with a 4–0 victory over Notre Dame, tying the school record for most shutouts in a season set by Cory Schneider.
On February 1, the Eagles defeated Harvard in the first round of the Beanpot, winning 3–2. Goalie Charlie Van Kula dressed as backup goaltender as Ian Milosz was declared out due to injury.
On February 8, the Eagles won their 20th Beanpot championship in school history, defeating BU 1–0 in overtime. It was the 22nd matchup against the rival Terriers in the Beanpot championship, and the Eagle's 10th victory in said matchup. The 1–0 result was the first time this was achieved in the Beanpot title game, by any combination of teams. It was also the sixth title game in the last eleven to go to overtime, and BC's sixth championship in seven years. Thatcher Demko also broke Cory Schneider's team single-season shutout record with his ninth shutout of the season.
On February 26, the Eagles defeated UMass Lowell 3–1 to secure the first overall seed in the Hockey East Tournament, as well as clinching at least a share of the Hockey East Regular season title, for best record in the conference. Additionally, Thatcher Demko was announced as a nominee for the Mike Richter Award as the nation's best goaltender.
With the loss to UMass Lowell on February 27 along with Providence's victory over Massachusetts, the Eagles and Friars finished the season tied in league lead for points, sharing the title for Hockey East regular season champions.
On March 13, the Eagles defeated Vermont in the Quarterfinals of the Hockey East playoffs, advancing to the semifinals for the first time since the 2012–13 season. They succeeded over the Catamounts in the best-of-three series in a rematch of the previous year's Quarterfinals.
On March 18, the Eagles were defeated by Northeastern in the Hockey East Tournament semifinals, 5–4. The Huskies would eventually win the championship with a 3–2 victory over UMass Lowell.
On March 27, the Eagles advanced to an NCAA-record 25th Frozen Four, after defeating Harvard and Minnesota-Duluth at the Northeast Regional, by scores of 3–1 and 3–2, respectively.
On April 7, the Eagles fell to Quinnipiac 2–3 in the Frozen Four, the last game for the four seniors on the team.
On April 8, Thatcher Demko was awarded the Mike Richter Award as the nation's top goaltender. He finish in the top 3 for voting for the Hobey Baker Award, which went to Harvard's Jimmy Vesey. Additionally, Steve Santini and Miles Wood both signed with their drafted team, the New Jersey Devils, forgoing the rest of their college careers.
On April 9, Teddy Doherty signed with the Missouri Mavericks of the ECHL.
On April 11, Adam Gilmour signed with his drafted team, the Minnesota Wild.
On April 13, Alex Tuch signed with his drafted team, the Minnesota Wild, becoming the fourth player this offseason to leave the program before graduation.
On April 19, the Eagles announced captains for the 2016–17 season. Rising seniors Ian McCoshen and Chris Calnan will serve as co-captains, and rising seniors Ryan Fitzgerald and Austin Cangelosi will serve as alternate captains for the season.
On April 20, Thatcher Demko signed with his drafted team, the Vancouver Canucks, the 5th early departure for the Eagles.
On June 20, Ian McCoshen signed with his drafted team, the Florida Panthers, forgoing his senior season and becoming the 6th eagle to depart the program early this offseason. He also chose to relinquished his assumed captainship, leaving Chris Calnan to serve as the sole captain for the 16–17 season.

Rankings

Statistics

Skaters

† Only played 5 games before leaving the program

Goaltenders

Awards and honors

Hobey Baker Award
Thatcher Demko, G – Hobey Hat Trick (Top 3) Finalist

Mike Richter Award
Thatcher Demko, G – Winner

AHCA Division I All-Americans
Thatcher Demko, G – Second Team
Ryan Fitzgerald, F – Second Team

Hockey East Awards
Thatcher Demko, G – Co-Player of the Year
Colin White, F – Rookie of the Year
Steve Santini, D – Old Time Hockey Best Defensive Defenseman

Hockey East All Stars
Thatcher Demko, G – All-First Team
Ryan Fitzgerald, F – All-First Team
Ian McCoshen, D – All-Second Team
Colin White, F – All-Second Team, All-Rookie Team
Casey Fitzgerald, D – All-Rookie Team
Austin Cangelosi, F – Honorable Mention

NCAA Rookie of the Month
Colin White, F – Month of November

Hockey East Goaltender of the Month
Thatcher Demko, G – Month of October, Month of November

Hockey East Rookie of the Month
Colin White, F – Month of November

NCAA Three Stars of the Week
Thatcher Demko, G – First Star, Week of October 26, 2015, First Star, Week of November 9, 2015 

Hockey East Player of the Week
Thatcher Demko, G – Week of November 9, 2015, Week of April 11, 2016
Teddy Doherty, D – Week of March 28, 2016

Hockey East Rookie of the Week
Colin White, F – Week of October 19, 2015, Week of November 30, 2015, Week of January 11, 2016
JD Dudek, F – Week of March 14, 2015
Casey Fitzgerald, D – Week of March 28, 2016, Week of April 11, 2016

Hockey East Defensive Player of the Week
Thatcher Demko, G – Week of October 26, 2015, Week of March 28, 2016
Ian McCoshen, D – Week of April 11, 2016

References

External links
BC Men's Hockey Home Page
BC Men's Hockey Page on USCHO

Boston College Eagles men's ice hockey seasons
Boston College Eagles
Boston College Eagles
Boston College Eagles men's ice hockey season
Boston College Eagles men's ice hockey season
Boston College
Boston College Eagles men's ice hockey season
Boston College Eagles men's ice hockey season